Willie Gary "Bunk" Johnson (December 27, 1879 – July 7, 1949) was an American prominent jazz trumpeter in New Orleans. Johnson gave the year of his birth as 1879, although there is speculation that he may have been younger by as much as a decade. Johnson stated on his 1937 application for Social Security that he was born on December 27, 1889. Many jazz historians believe this date of birth to be the most accurate of the various dates Johnson gave throughout his life.

Biography

Education and early musical career
Johnson received lessons from Adam Olivier and began playing professionally in Olivier's orchestra. Johnson probably played a few adolescent jobs with Buddy Bolden, but was not a regular member of Bolden's Band (contrary to Johnson's claim). Johnson was regarded as one of the leading trumpeters in New Orleans in the years 1905–1915, in between repeatedly leaving the city to tour with minstrel shows and circus bands.

After he failed to appear for a New Orleans Mardi Gras parade job in 1915, he learned that krewe members intended to do him bodily harm. So he left town, touring with shows and then by the early 1920s settling in New Iberia, Louisiana.

In 1931, he lost his trumpet and front teeth when a fight broke out at a dance in Rayne, Louisiana, putting an end to his playing. He thereafter worked in manual labor, occasionally giving music lessons.

Career revival and first recordings
In 1938 and 1939, the writers of an early jazz history book, Jazzmen, interviewed several prominent musicians of the time, including Louis Armstrong, Sidney Bechet, and Clarence Williams, who spoke highly of Johnson in the old days in New Orleans. The writers tracked down Johnson's address, and traded several letters with him, where he recalled (and possibly embellished) his early career. Johnson stated that he could play again if he only had new teeth and a new trumpet. A collection was taken up by writers and musicians, and he was fitted with a set of dentures by Bechet's dentist brother, Leonard, and given a new trumpet. He made his first recordings in 1942, for Jazz Man Records.

Later touring career
These first recordings propelled Johnson (along with clarinetist George Lewis) into public attention. Johnson and his band played in New Orleans, San Francisco, Boston, and New York City and made many more recordings. Johnson's work in the 1940s shows why he was well regarded by his fellow musicians. On his best days he played with great imagination, subtlety, and beauty, as well as suggesting why he had not gained prominence earlier, for he was unpredictable, temperamental, with a passive-aggressive streak and a fondness for drinking alcohol to the point of impairment.

Death
Johnson suffered from a stroke in late 1948 and died in New Iberia the following year.

Legacy 
Jazz historians have debated Johnson's legacy, and the extent to which his colorful reminiscences of his early career were accurate, misremembered, exaggerated, or untrue. Although in recent years, new evidence has appeared in jazz historian Vic Hobson's 2014 Creating Jazz Counterpoint. New Orleans, Barbershop Harmony, and the Blues, in which is stated that Buddy Bolden's band member Willy Cornish — who is seen on the only surviving picture of the Bolden Band — affirmed Bunk Johnson as a member of the early jazz group. This puts Johnson's own statements and recordings, in which he actively recreated the Bolden tunes, in a plausible and positive light, making them of great historical and musicological importance to the study of jazz and New Orleans jazz in particular.

His recordings have been reissued on CD. Johnson plays a small, but significant, role in Alan Schroeder's picture book Satchmo's Blues. In that book, Johnson serves as a source of musical inspiration to the young Louis Armstrong.

Johnson was a Catholic, and as of 2019 an annual Jazz Mass and procession was conducted in his hometown of New Iberia, beginning at St Edward Catholic Church and ending at Johnson's gravesite.

Selected discography

1942
The following records were recorded June, 1942, and released on Jazz Man Records.
 "Down By The River / Panama": Jazz Man 8. Recorded in New Orleans, 1942.
 "Weary Blues / Moose March": Jazz Man 9. Recorded in New Orleans, 1942.
 "Storyville Blues / Bunk's Blues": Jazz Man 10. Recorded in New Orleans, 1942.

The following records were recorded October, 1942, and released on Milt Gabler's Jazz Information label, distributed by Commodore Records.
 "Franklin Street Blues / Weary Blues": Jazz Information 12. Recorded in New Orleans, 1942.
 "Shine / Yaaka Hula Hickey Dula": Jazz Information 15. Recorded in New Orleans, 1942.
 "Sobbin' Blues No. 2 / Sometimes My Burden Is So Hard To Bear": Jazz Information 16. Recorded in New Orleans, 1942.

American Music Records, 1943-1946
The following records include recordings made for Bill Russell's American Music label between 1943 and 1946.
 Bunk Plays The Blues And Spirituals: American Music 638 (10" LP). Recorded in New Orleans. Includes recordings by Johnson's working band (August 1944) and a brass band (May, 1945).
 1944-1946: American Music 644 (10" LP). Recorded in New Orleans, May 1945, and New York, June 1946. Includes recordings by Johnson's working band (1945) and a trio featuring Don Ewell (1946).
 New Orleans 1944: American Music 647 (10" LP). Recorded in New Orleans, August 1944.
 Rare And Unissued Masters, Volume 1 (1943-1945): American Music AMCD-139. CD; reissued as ORG Music ORGM-2101 on LP for Record Store Day 2018. Includes further recordings by Johnson's working band (July–August 1944; May 1945) and Johnson's brass band (May, 1945); also includes duets with pianist Bertha Gonsoulin recorded in San Francisco, May 1943.

San Francisco, 1944
Bunk Johnson recorded for Good Time Jazz with the Yerba Buena Jazz Band in early 1944.
 Bunk Johnson and the Yerba Buena Jazz Band: Spirituals & Jazz: Good Time Jazz L-17. Recorded in San Francisco, January–February 1944.

New York, 1945
Bunk Johnson recorded for Blue Note in March, 1945, and for Decca and RCA Victor in late 1945.
 Sidney Bechet and Bunk Johnson: Days Beyond Recall: Blue Note BLP 7008. Recorded in New York, March 1945.
 Hot Jazz: RCA Victor HJ-7. Album of four 78 RPM shellac records; recorded in New York, December 1945.
 New Orleans Memories: Ace of Hearts AH 140. 12" LP, includes four recordings from a Decca session in New York, November 1945. Also includes recordings by Kid Ory and George Lewis.

New York, 1947
Bunk Johnson's final recordings were made for Columbia in December, 1947.
 The Last Testament Of A Great New Orleans Jazzman: Columbia CL 829. 12" LP, recorded at Carnegie Recital Hall, New York City, December 1947.

References

External links 
Detailed discussion of research on Bunk's early life and possible birthdates
The Swedish Bunk Johnson Society
Willie (Bunk) Johnson's WWI Draft Registration Card and essay
William Russell Jazz Collection at  The Historic New Orleans Collection

1879 births
1949 deaths
Dixieland trumpeters
Dixieland bandleaders
Jazz musicians from New Orleans
American jazz trumpeters
American male trumpeters
African-American musicians
Blue Note Records artists
People from New Iberia, Louisiana
American male jazz musicians
The Eagle Band members
Good Time Jazz Records artists
African-American Catholics
20th-century African-American people